Directive 2001/77/EC is a European Union Directive for promoting renewable energy use in electricity generation. It is popularly known as the RES Directive. 

The directive, which took effect in October 2001, sets national indicative targets for renewable energy production from individual member states. As the name implies, the EU does not strictly enforce these targets. However, The European Commission monitors the progress of the member states of the European Union – and will, if necessary, propose mandatory targets for those who miss their goals. 

These objectives contribute toward achieving the overall indicative EU targets, which are listed in the white paper on renewable sources of energy. Regulators want a 12% share of gross renewable domestic energy consumption by 2010 and a 20% share by 2020.

The directive was superseded by Directive 2009/28/EC, published on 23 April 2009.

National targets 

The following table lists the indicative targets for each of the 15 original member states, and for comparison the share of renewable electricity in 1997 as well.

See also 
 Energy policy of the European Union

External links 
Text of the directive
"Renewable energy: the promotion of electricity from renewable energy sources" – from the official “Summaries of EU legislation” website

2001 in law
2001 in the European Union
Energy policies and initiatives of the European Union
European Union directives
Renewable energy policy